Albert Edward Fleet (16 June 1880 – 1953) was an English professional footballer who played as a wing half.

References

1880 births
1953 deaths
Sportspeople from Great Yarmouth
English footballers
Association football wing halves
Grimsby Rangers F.C. players
Grimsby Town F.C. players
Rotherham County F.C. players
English Football League players